The Fuel and Electricity (Control) Act 1973 was an Act of the Parliament of the United Kingdom which empowered the Secretary of State to control the production, supply, acquisition and use of petroleum, petroleum derived products, substances used as fuel, and electricity.

Background 
The Yom Kippur War in the Middle East created considerable uncertainty over oil supplies and prices. Furthermore, industrial action had taken place in the UK electricity power industry and the coal industry engendering further uncertainty about supplies.

A short enabling Act allowed the Secretary of State for Trade and Industry and President of the Board of Trade to temporarily control the production, supply, acquisition and use of petroleum and petroleum products and any other substance used as fuel, and the production, supply and use of electricity.

Fuel and Electricity (Control) Act 1973 
The Fuel and Electricity (Control) Act 1973 (1973 c. 67) received Royal Assent on 6 December 1973. Its long title is ‘An Act to make temporary provision for controlling the production, supply, acquisition and use of certain substances and of electricity; and for purposes connected with those matters’.

Provisions 
The Act comprises 11 Sections

 Section 1 Application of Act
 Section 2 Powers of control
 Section 3 Documents and information
 Section 4 Power to relax statutory and contractual obligations, etc.
 Section 5 Application of provisions of Emergency Laws (Re-enactments and Repeals) Act 1964
 Section 6 Offences and penalties
 Section 7 Expenses
 Section 8 Interpretation
 Section 9 Isle of Man and Channel Islands
 Section 10 Duration of Act
 Section 11 Short title and extent

Effects of the Act 
The Act enabled Orders to be made to restrict lighting and heating. A 3-day working week for industry was introduced on 17 December 1973. Shops and offices could only use electricity in the morning or afternoon. There were also voltage reductions and load disconnections.

The Act was in force for the initial term of one year which expired on 30 November 1974. The Act was extended twice by:

 the Fuel and Electricity (Control) Act 1973 (Continuation) Order 1974 Statutory Instrument 1974 No. 1893.
 the Fuel and Electricity (Control) Act 1973 (Continuation) Order 1975 Statutory Instrument 1975 No. 1705.

Repeal 
The Act was repealed in the United Kingdom by the Energy Act 1976. However, it remained in renewable force in the Crown Dependencies. In the Channel Islands and the Isle of Man until the last continuation in 1977; in Jersey and the Isle of Man until the last continuation in 1979 and in Jersey until the last continuation in 1989.

See also 

 Timeline of the UK electricity supply industry

References 

Electric power in the United Kingdom
United Kingdom Acts of Parliament 1973
History of the petroleum industry in the United Kingdom
Natural gas industry in the United Kingdom